Hafezabad (also Romanized as Ḩāfez̧ābād; also known as Dabestān-e Ḩāfez̧ābād) is a village in Zeydabad Rural District, in the Central District of Sirjan County, Kerman Province, Iran. At the 2006 census, its population was 303, in 87 families.

References 

Populated places in Sirjan County